Merei or Malmariv is an Oceanic language spoken in north central Espiritu Santo Island in Vanuatu.

There are two varieties, Tiale, or Malmariv, and Merei, or Lametin. They are mutually intelligible according to a comparison of 234 words, which showed 94.87% cognate similarity. There are an estimated 800 speakers of Malmariv-Merei or Tiale-Lametin. Merei, as well as Tiale, are both spoken by roughly 60% of the children in the villages. The members of the population have a positive attitude towards the threatened language, with Merei being spoken by approximately 400 people as a mother tongue. There are at least four villages where Merei is spoken, Angoru, Navele, Tombet and Vusvogo. These villages are located between the Ora and Lape rivers in the central area of Espiritu Santo Island.

Merei is an SVO language, aligning itself with many of the typical Oceanic features. Subject pronouns, modality, and aspect markers occur preverbally, object pronouns and aspect adverbs follow the verb, and possessives are divided into direct and indirect (or inalienable and alienable respectively).

Phonology
Merei has a phoneme inventory consisting of sixteen consonants and five vowels. The combinations of vowels can form nine diphthongs.

Consonants

There is also a consonant previously listed in the consonant chart written as |pm|.

Vowels

Merei has a common 5 vowel system that languages like Spanish have.

Morphology

Pronouns and person markers
The pronominal system contains two free-form categories, independent pronouns and preverbal subject pronouns, and two bound categories, object pronominal suffix and possessive pronominal suffix. No gender or animate distinction is made. Pronouns only have animate reference.

The pronominal system makes a distinction between first, second and third persons. Singular, dual, and plural are marked by number. First person dual and plural makes the distinction between inclusive and exclusive.

Independent pronouns 

In this example we see the 2nd person independent pronoun being used as a speech act of invitation.

Example 2 shows use of the first person plural exclusive independent pronoun .

Preverbal subject pronouns and suffixes 

Example 3 below uses the preverbal subject pronoun nam and the possessive pronominal suffix -gu.

Example 4 below demonstrates the absence of a 3rd person singular preverbal subject pronoun and also contains the 3rd person plural pronominal suffix -ra.

Reflexive pronouns 
Reflexive pronouns are formed from the root nese- followed by a possessive pronominal suffix. It can be used in concurrence with the free pronoun and is often followed by the free particle nga 'only' as seen in example 5 and 6 below.

Demonstrative pronouns 
Demonstrative pronouns consist of a mix of locational adverbs and third person pronouns. They have three possible functions: they can occupy the whole noun phrase slot, act as an independent nominal argument or be placed at the end of a noun phrase to modify the noun-head. The classifications of demonstrative adverbs are based on two aspects: speaker-hearer reference and spatial reference. 

Shows get-nie a speaker hearer referenced demonstrative pronoun:

Shows get-ire a speaker hearer referenced demonstrative pronoun:

Spatial reference demonstrative pronouns are formed by the third person independent pronouns, nie and ire when linked to spatial adverbial adverbs.

Possessive constructions 

In the Malmariv language, there are two possessive formations, direct and indirect. In certain situations, both of them are simultaneously possible. When in this predicament, if the possessed is more closely linked to the possessor, then it is classed as direct poIndirect Possessiond to indirect possession.

The possessive construction of the Merei language is typical Oceanic. There are different types of the classifiers and genitive prepositions of indirect possessive according to the edibility of the noun heads, however the word for tattoo ‘bur’ is an exception to the edible noun class.

Pronominal object suffixes and non-singular pronominal possessive suffixes are practically identical.

Direct possession 
In direct pronominal possession a possessed inalienable noun head is followed by a poBoth Direct and Indirect Possession shown in table 4 above. This type of formation is normally related with body parts, familial terms, and relationships between location and part-whole connections.

Examples 11, 12 and 13 show the relative possessive pronominal suffix pairing with the possessed noun.

The directly possessed noun is followed by the possessor noun phrase when the possessor is a nominal. This is shown in examples 14, 15 and 16.

Indirect Possession 
With indirect pronominal possession, there is a Possessive Classifier that precedes the indirectly possessed alienable noun head. The Possessive Classifier for inedible nouns is nou- (POSSC.I), and a- (or less commonly na-) for edible and drinkable nouns (POSSC.E), followed by the possessive pronominal suffix.

Example 17 shows the Possessive Classifier for inedible nouns

Example 18 shows the Possessive Classifier for edible and drinkable nouns

In indirect nominal possession the indirectly possessive noun head is followed by a genitive preposition, nui for inedible (GEN.I) and nai for edible (GEN.E), which are followed by the possessor noun.

Example 19 shows the genitive preposition for inedible nouns

Example 20 shows the genitive preposition for edible nouns

The benefactive preposition sei can also function as genitive preposition. it operates as part of the noun phrase and functions like a descriptive normal modifier or a possessive construction.

Both Direct and Indirect Possession 
Many Oceanic languages have the ability to possess nouns both directly and indirectly. This difference in possession changes the meaning of the nouns affected. In indirect possession, the relationship between the possessed and the possessor is not as close as the direct possessive.

Examples 22 and 23 below show the difference that indirect and direct possession have on the noun 'night'.

The following examples show the difference that indirect and direct possession have on the noun 'road'.

Negation and Modality 
Negation is closely related to Modality in Merei, and negation can be considered a propositional modality (cited in,). Thus it is useful to discuss the two in the same section. There are three modalities in Merei, realis (R), presupposition (PSP), and irrealis (IRR).

All non-third person forms of negative modality markers share the same form tei. The third person singular and dual negative forms can be formed by adding tei to the end of the positive form, whereas in the plural tei is added to the suffix -ta.

Negative third person dual irrealis modality:

Negation in verbless equative clauses is marked by the irrealis marker mo or mu followed by the negative marker tei. This comes before the second noun phrase, the particle mo or mu is used for all persons.

Negative existential clauses are formed in Merei by following the basic intransitive structure of a verbal clause.

To form a negative existential clause the predicate slot is replaced by the verb va 'go' which is followed by the negative deictic merei and the clause takes only a single subject. 

Existential clause

Negative existential clause

By adding the particle of prohibition tla after the subject pronoun, imperative and hortative clauses can be negated. This can function as either prohibition or pleading, depending on context and intonation. The distinction between prohibition and pleading depends on the meaning of the verbs and intonation or it may require a more specific declaration.

References

Bibliography

External links
Database of audio recordings in Malmariv (Wusiroro) - basic Catholic prayers

Espiritu Santo languages
Languages of Vanuatu
Vulnerable languages